Oskar Lang (born December 4, 1996) is a Swedish professional ice hockey forward. He is currently playing with Leksands IF of the Swedish Hockey League (SHL).

Playing career
Lang made his Swedish Hockey League debut playing with Leksands IF during the 2014–15 SHL season.

International play
Lang joined the Swedish National Team, following completion of the 2021–22 season, and after six friendly games was later selected to the preliminary squad to compete at the 2022 IIHF World Championship in Finland on 11 May 2022.

Career statistics

Regular season and playoffs

International

References

External links

1996 births
Living people
Leksands IF players
Swedish ice hockey forwards